Jaadu is a 1995 Bollywood film starring Shahrukh Khan and Juhi Chawla.

Soundtrack

References

1995 films
1990s Hindi-language films
Films scored by Nikhil-Vinay